The Oregon State Forester's Office Building is a historic building in Salem, Oregon, United States that is used by the head of the Oregon Department of Forestry. The 1938 building was listed on the National Register of Historic Places (NRHP) in 1982.  It was designed by Linn A. Forrest in the "National Park Style". The NRHP listing includes two additional contributing structures.

References

1938 establishments in Oregon
Office buildings completed in 1938
National Register of Historic Places in Salem, Oregon
Works Progress Administration in Oregon
National Park Service rustic in Oregon